Hildegard Reitter (born 1936) is an Austrian gymnast. She competed in six events at the 1960 Summer Olympics.

References

1936 births
Living people
Austrian female artistic gymnasts
Olympic gymnasts of Austria
Gymnasts at the 1960 Summer Olympics
Place of birth missing (living people)
20th-century Austrian women